The Ministry of Justice and Human Rights of Angola is judiciary arm of government that specializes on human rights in the nation of Angola.

History 
The Ministry of Justice and Human Rights of Angola was established on November 12, 1975 by Law No. 1/75 after the country declared its independence.

Duties and responsibilities 
The Ministry of Justice and Human Rights of Angola has the following duties:

 To design, establish, establish and conduct the administration of justice policy
 Conceive, establish, outline and conduct the policy for the promotion and protection of human rights 
 To elaborate and propose legal norms on the organization of the courts
 To exercise supervision, coordination and methodological guidance on the organic activity of the Provincial and Municipal Courts
 Take measures to achieve a justice aimed at harmonizing all the social trends of the country
 To ensure the proper functioning of the system of judicial administration in judicial matters and in the areas of legal traffic safety, dispute prevention and non-judicial resolution of disputes
 Provide for the adoption of normative measures adequate to the pursuit of the justice policies defined by the executive branch, as well as to ensure the study, elaboration and follow-up of the implementation of integrated normative measures in the area of justice
 Recruit, train, promote, as well as exercise you can discipline officers of the judiciary and other personnel of the general regime
 To ensure the formation of the necessary personnel for the exercise of the specific functions in the area of justice
 To manage human resources assigned to the administration of justice, without prejudice to the competence of other organs
 Ensure legal and judicial cooperation with other governments and international organizations
 To legally advise all the structures and entities of the executive branch, as long as they use and are authorized by the competent authorities
 To study, propose and collaborate in the elaboration and systematization of the country's legislation, in the dissemination of the law and in the formation of the juridical and social conscience of the citizen
 Prepare the annual legislative plan of the Ministry to be submitted to the approval of the holder of the executive branch
 Assuming responsibility for public records, namely, civil, commercial, real estate, motor vehicles and other movable property subject to registration, in accordance with the law
 To coordinate activities relating to the right of asylum and to actions resulting from anti-drug conventions
 Ensure and promote respect for human rights in the various domains, throughout the national territory
 To guarantee the exchange between the Minsitério and other organisms that intervene in the protection of the political, economic and social rights of the citizens 
 Create mechanisms to control the policies outlined for the promotion and protection of human rights 
 To propose measures of prevention and violation of human rights
 To carry out studies aimed at improving the organs that intervene in the observance and respect for human rights
 To carry out other activities assigned to it by law

List of ministers (Post-1975 upon achieving independence) 

 Jose Alberto Deheza (1976)
 Diogenes de Assis Boavida (1976-1986)
 Fernando Franca Van Dunem (1987-1990)
 Lazaro Manuel Dias (1991-1992)
 Paulo Tjipilica (1993-2004)
 Manuel Miguel da Costa Aragão (2005-2008)
 Guilhermina Contreiras da Costa Prata (2008-2012) [1st female]
 Rui Jorge Carneiro Mangueira (2012-2017)
 Francisco Manuel Monteiro de Queiroz (2018–present)

See also 

 Justice ministry
Office of the Attorney General (Angola)
 Politics of Angola

References 

Justice ministries
Government ministries of Angola